KZRX (92.1 FM), known as "Z-92.1", is a radio station broadcasting a mainstream rock format serving Western North Dakota from Dickinson, North Dakota. The station is currently owned by iHeartMedia, Inc.

History
Signed on the air as KRRB in 1983 with an AC format, KZRX signed on in 1998, after Roberts Radio bought the station from Roughrider Broadcasting.  KZRX went under a short lived moniker, aliasing themselves as "92.1 The Point"; and later as "Z92", starting back in the spring of 2001. The station ran a Hot AC format, then a mainstream rock format.  For the first time since the frequency's original launch, back in 1983 (as KRRB), Z92FM broadcast 24 hours a day.

External links
KZRX official website

ZRX
Classic rock radio stations in the United States
Radio stations established in 1983
1983 establishments in North Dakota
IHeartMedia radio stations